Donald Dennis Hughes (born February 22, 1948) is a former American football tight end who played two seasons with the Pittsburgh Steelers of the National Football League. He played college football at the University of Georgia and attended Seneca High School in Seneca, South Carolina. He was also a member of the Jacksonville Sharks/Express of the World Football League.

References

External links
Just Sports Stats
College stats

Living people
1948 births
Players of American football from South Carolina
American football tight ends
Georgia Bulldogs football players
Pittsburgh Steelers players
Jacksonville Sharks (WFL) players
Jacksonville Express players
People from Seneca, South Carolina